Supreme Show is the seventh studio album by Japanese recording artist Ami Suzuki. It was released on November 12, 2008 by Avex Trax as her 10th Anniversary album. It was also released ten months after her joint project album, Dolce.  Supreme Show is Suzuki's first album to be fully produced, composed, and arranged by Japanese musician and Capsule member Yasutaka Nakata. Suzuki contributed to the album as the lead vocalist, background vocalist, and co-songwriter for the track "Love Mail". With tracks recorded in both English and Japanese language, Supreme Show is an electronic dance music album.

Four different formats were released to promote the album; a standalone CD regular edition, a CD+DVD limited edition, a CD+DVD edition exclusive for "mu-mo", and a digital release worldwide. Three different artworks were issued for the album; all three have Suzuki posing in different ways. Upon the album's release, it was met with favourable reviews from music critics. Critics commended the album's production and the accompanying single releases for their commercial quality. Commercially, Supreme Show was a moderate success. Supreme Show became Suzuki's first studio album to reach the top twenty on Japan's Oricon Albums Chart,  since Around the World in 2005. Despite this, it charted with lukewarm success, reaching number sixteen and selling over 13,000 units in that region.

Two singles were released from Supreme Show. Its lead single "One" was a moderate commercial success, peaking at number 16 on the Japanese Oricon Singles Chart and 57 on the Japan Hot 100 chart. It sold over 8,000 physical units in that region. The album's second and final single, "Can't Stop the Disco", was a moderate commercial success; it peaked at number 17 on the Japanese Oricon Singles Chart and 47 on the Japan Hot 100 chart. Suzuki promoted the album on several live gigs and concert performances; she later promoted the album on her Happy 27th Birthday Tour and Happy 28th Birthday Tour, both which included tracks from Supreme Show.

Background and development
In September 2008, it was confirmed by Suzuki that she would release a then-upcoming studio album. Supreme Show is Suzuki's first solo studio album since Around the World in 2005. Suzuki and her record label Avex Trax hired Japanese musician and Capsule member Yasutaka Nakata to compose, produce, write, and arrange the then-upcoming album. This marks Nakata's first full-length production effort with Suzuki, and his second collaboration with Suzuki since their August 2007 a-side single "Free Free" and "Super Music Maker". Supreme Show was Nakata's fourth fully produced studio album in 2008, and his last production of 2008; he had produced, written, composed, and arranged the studio albums: Game by Japanese female trio Perfume, Step by Japanese musician Meg, and More! More! More! by Capsule. Supreme Show marks her seventh studio album to be produced by a sole producer; her first three albums SA (1999), Infinity Eighteen Vol. 1, and Infinity Eighteen Vol. 2 (2000) were produced by Japanese producer Tetsuya Komuro, whilst her latter three albums Around the World, Connetta (2007), and Dolce were produced by Max Matsuura.

Composition

Supreme Show is an electronic dance music album with numerous elements of dance-pop, house, synthpop, and J-pop. According to Suzuki, she stated that she was trying to "re-invent" herself during the 2007 period; as a result, her enlisting Nakata allowed her to work through electronic dance and house music. An editor from Channel-Ai labelled Suzuki during her 2008 music period as a "disco queen". Suzuki had spoken with Robert Michael Poole from The Japan Times, and stated during the process; "I was wondering what kind of music would fit me now, and as I searched, I realized that house and electro really fits me. I had been going to a lot of club events recently with Nakata... That scene attracts hardcore music fans, and I realized that working with this producer would be extremely cool and would transcend Japanese pop convention." She later stated "I have made a lot of different styles of music in my career, and I want to be free to go with what I feel in my bones at the time. People may wonder which form is the one I enjoy the most, or which one fits me best, but at this time I can say with confidence that this electro style is great for me."

Majority of the album's tracks are composed as electronic dance songs, and Suzuki's vocals on every track are processed with autotune and vocoder post-production work. This is Suzuki's second studio album to use autotune and vocoder effects since Dolce. "Can't Stop the Disco", the album's second single, was described as a dance-pop song with numerous musical elements, including techno, disco, and club music. "Super Music Maker" is a remixed version by Nakata that appeared on Dolce. "Climb up to the Top" was described as a 1990s inspired dance song. "Mysterious" was described as a "sexy" atmospheric song by critics, whilst "A Token of Love" was noted for its strong rhythm. "One" was described as a dance-pop song with numerous musical elements, including club music. Suzuki contributed to the album as the lead vocalist, background vocalist, and co-songwriter for the track "Love Mail"; Nakata wrote and composed all the tracks. The album is Suzuki's second album after Dolce to emphasize full English language songs; in total, Supreme Show features three English, one bilingual, and seven Japanese tracks.

Release and packaging
Supreme Show was released in four different formats on November 12, 2008, by Avex Trax as her 10th anniversary album. It was also released ten months after her joint project album Dolce, but this album was not recognized as a 10th anniversary album. This is Suzuki's first double album release in one year; in 2000, both Infinity Eighteen Vol. 1 and Infinity Eighteen Vol. 2 were released, in February and April respectively. Supreme Shows first format, the stand-alone CD, features the eleven tracks in a jewel case, with first press editions including an obi with details of her 10th anniversary. The CD and DVD format features the eleven tracks in a jewel case, and a bonus DVD with the music videos to "One" and "Can't Stop the Disco", and a live performance at Club Asia. The limited edition CD and DVD format features the eleven tracks in a jewel case, and a live DVD releases of her Cruise Party concert and the live performance at Club Asia. This edition was released exclusively to mu-mo stores in Japan. The final format is the digital release.

All four cover sleeves for Supreme Show were photographed by Japanese photographer and designer Takaki Kumada. The standalone CD artwork has Suzuki in a female-esque tuxedo; the tuxedo jacket is digitally created with small blue fluorescent orb lights. The CD and music video DVD format has Suzuki turning her back, posing towards the camera; the mini-dress is digitally created with small pink fluorescent orb lights. The CD and live DVD format has a close-up shot of Suzuki's face wearing a feathered hat; the feathered hat is digitally created with small yellow fluorescent orb lights. The digital release uses the standalone CD format. The cover sleeve for all four formats is placed at the back of the jewel case, with the front cover featuring a booklet with an unreleased photo. The booklet and photo shoot were designed by Masaru Yoshikawa, and each booklet from the four format features slightly different images of Suzuki.

Critical reception

Supreme Show received favourable reviews from most music critics. A staff reviewer from CD Journal was positive towards the album, praising the collaboration between Suzuki and Nakata. The reviewer commended the "futuristic" sound, and believed Nakata's production was the reason why its quality "shine[d]". A staff reviewer from Amazon Japan was very positive towards its "authentic electro" sound, and complimented its commercial appeal; the reviewer notified its commercial appeal through Suzuki's "fashion" on the album cover, and sound. The reviewer went on to say the album was a "cool" evolution of Suzuki's career. A retrospective review came from Kaichan at Gooume.jp, stating that the album "still [sounds] modern and up to date." Labelling it a "great album", Kaichan concluded "Supreme Show is an impeccable and super solid piece of work for people who love EDM." A staff reviewer from HMV Japan was positive towards the album, complimenting the "excellent" collaborations between Suzuki and Nakata. The reviewer also commended Suzuki's "sexy" and "cute" image throughout the album. Robert Michael Poole from The Japan Times compared the album to Australian recording artist Kylie Minogue, and believed it was her "comeback" album after poor sales from previous studio albums.

Commercial performance
Supreme Show debuted at number 16 on both the Japanese Daily and Weekly Oricon Albums Chart, with an estimate 8,748 sold units in its first week of sales. This was the eighth highest charting album by a female, and the ninth highest chart debut album of that week. This Suzuki's first studio album to reach the top twenty on Japan's Oricon Albums Chart, since Around the World at five. Supreme Show fell to fifty-three in its second week with an estimated 2,373 sold units, and eventually stayed in the top 300 for four weeks; this is her fourth equal studio album alongside Dolce with the most weeks on Oricon. Supreme Show entered the Billboard Top Albums Sales Chart at 24, the fifth highest debut album of that week. It fell to 66 in its second charting week, and stayed in the top 100 for two weeks overall. At the end of 2008, Supreme Show sold over 13,094 units in Japan; this is Suzuki's highest selling album since Around the World with 62,022 sold units. As of January 2016, Oricon's database has ranked Supreme Show as Suzuki's sixth best-selling album overall.

Promotion

Singles

"One" was released as the album's lead single on June 18, 2008. "One" was used for one television commercials in Japan; Nippon TV's series All Japan High School Quiz Championships, which was used as the ending theme song. Upon its release, "One" garnered positive reviews from music critics and was praised for its composition and commercial appeal.  It also achieved lukewarm success in her native Japan, peaking at number 17 on the Japanese Oricon Singles Chart, 47 on the Billboard Japan Hot 100 chart, 27 on the Billboard Hot Singles Sales Chart, and 67 on the Billboard Radio Songs Chart. The song has sold over eight thousand units in Japan alone; this is her best selling single since "Free Free" with over 10,000 units. The accompanying music video for "One" was shot in Tokyo; it features Suzuki inside of a club, surrounded by LED lamps and several club poles and lights.

"Can't Stop the Disco" was released as the album's second and final single on September 24, 2008. "Can't Stop the Disco" was used for two television commercials in Japan; The Mr. Donut campaign and the Japanese television show Gyotekku, which was used as the ending theme song. Upon its release, "Can't Stop the Disco" garnered positive reviews from music critics and was praised for its composition and commercial appeal. It also achieved lukewarm success in her native Japan, peaking at number 17 on the Japanese Oricon Singles Chart, 47 on the Billboard Japan Hot 100 chart, 37 on the Billboard Hot Singles Sales chart, and 54 on the Billboard Radio Songs chart. The song has sold over six thousand units in Japan alone; this is her final single to reach over the five thousand sales limit. The accompanying music video for "Can't Stop the Disco" was shot in Tokyo; it features Suzuki in several different four-by-four rooms, all centring around Suzuki's fashion and the visual aesthetics.

Live performances and releases
To promote Supreme Show, Suzuki performed on several live performances and gig concerts. She marked her first promotional performance on her One Party, which consisted live performances in celebration of Suzuki's 10th Anniversary of her career; the set list included "One" and "Can't Stop the Disco" Suzuki performed at the annual 2008 A-nation concert tour all around Japan; she performed "One". Suzuki performed as a disc jockey on the Club Asia DJ tour, where she performed songs from Supreme Show; the performance was directed by Chikara Saeki and was included on the CD and music video DVD format of the album. Suzuki conducted two club party events which were also hosted by Suzuki: the 2008 Cruising Party, and a live performance at Club Asia. For the first party, she performed all tracks from Supreme Show. The Club Asia performance included "Can't Stop the Disco", "Flower", and "One"; both parties were released on the CD and live DVD format of Supreme Show.

Suzuki announced her Happy 27th Birthday Tour in 2009, which also celebrated the release of Supreme Show and the annual Countdown show in Shibuya, Japan. The track list included "Super Music Maker", "Can't Stop the Disco", "Ten", "Love Mail", "True", "Flower", and "Climb to the Top"; "Climb to the Top" was not a performance by Suzuki, but a performance of pole dancing. The tour received favourable reviews from music critics, who praised the performances and visuals. She extended the tour the following year on her Ami Suzuki Anniversary Tour; for the set list, she included "Can't Stop the Disco", "Super Music Maker", and "One".

Track listing
All songs written and composed by Yasutaka Nakata, except "Love Mail" was co-written by Suzuki.

All formats
 Standard CD – Consists of eleven songs on one disc.
 First pressing standard CD – Consists of eleven songs on one disc. First pressing issues include a bonus poster and cardboard sleeve case.
 CD and DVD – Consists of eleven songs on one disc. Includes two music videos and one live performance on the second disc. 
 First pressing CD and DVD – Consists of eleven songs on one disc. Includes two music videos and one live performance on the second disc. First pressing issues include a bonus poster and cardboard sleeve case. 
 CD and Live DVD – Consists of eleven songs on one disc. Includes two live performance on the second disc; this is exclusive to all Mu-Mo stores. 
 Digital download – Consists of eleven songs on one disc.

Personnel
Credits adapted from the liner notes of Supreme Show.
Ami Suzuki – vocals, background vocals, song writing
Yasutaka Nakata – song writing, producing, composing, arranging, engineer, mixing, recorded by
Takuji Koga – A&R
Masaru Yoshikawa – art direction, design
Masahiro Nakawaki – art direction
Max Matsuura – executive producer
Takaki Kumada – album photography
Yoshihiro Seki – promotion supervisor
Avex Trax – Suzuki's record label and management
Avex Entertainment Inc. – Suzuki's distribution label
Contemode – Nakata's distribution label, co-rights

Charts and sales

Charts

Sales

Release history

See also
Ami Suzuki discography

References

Notes

References

External links
Supreme Show – Ami Suzuki's Official website.

2008 albums
Ami Suzuki albums
Avex Group albums
Albums produced by Yasutaka Nakata